The 2004 Waterford Senior Hurling Championship was the 104th staging of the Waterford Senior Hurling Championship since its establishment by the Waterford County Board in 1897. The draw for the opening round fixtures took place on 26 January 2004. The championship began on 2 May 2004 and ended on 4 December 2004.

Mount Sion were the defending champions.

On 10 October 2004, Mount Sion won the championship after a 4-14 to 4-07 defeat of Ballygunner in the final at Walsh Park. It was their 34th championship title overall and their third title in succession.

Lismore's Dave Bennett was the championship's top scorer with 4-52.

Team changes

To Championship

Promoted from the Waterford Intermediate Hurling Championship
 Abbeyside

From Championship

Relegated to the Waterford Intermediate Hurling Championship
 Portlaw

Results

First round

Second round

Preliminary round

Winners' group

Losers' group

Relegation play-offs

Losers' group

Quarter-final

Semi-finals

Final

Championship statistics

Top scorers

Top scorers overall

Top scorers in a single game

References

Waterford
Waterford Senior Hurling Championship